Karl Falkenberg (born Karl Franz Josef Falkenberg, 6 April 1887 – died after 1936) was a German-Jewish film actor.

Selected filmography
 Clown Charly (1918)
 Cain (1918)
 Blackmailed (1920)
 The Song of the Puszta (1920)
 The Grand Babylon Hotel (1920)
 Parisian Women (1921)
 The Terror of the Red Mill (1921)
 Evelyn's Love Adventures (1921)
 The Passenger in the Straitjacket (1922)
 The Testament of Joe Sivers (1922)
 Your Bad Reputation (1922)
 The Unwritten Law (1922)
 His Wife, The Unknown (1923)
 Resurrection (1923)
 Maciste and Prisoner 51 (1923)
 Maciste and the Chinese Chest (1923)
 Bob and Mary (1923)
 The Tragedy of a Night of Passion (1924)
 The Heart of Lilian Thorland (1924)
 The Four Last Seconds of Quidam Uhl (1924)
 Slaves of Love (1924)
 Mrs Worrington's Perfume (1925)
 Unmarried Daughters (1926)
 Hunted People (1926)
 The Last Horse Carriage in Berlin (1926)
 Nixchen (1926)
 The Love of the Bajadere (1926)
 Eyes Open, Harry! (1926)
 Hunted People (1926)
 The Page Boy at the Golden Lion (1928)
 Children of the Street (1929)
 Big City Children (1929)
 Roses Bloom on the Moorland (1929)
 The Call of the North (1929)
 Morals at Midnight (1930)
 Of Life and Death (1930)
 Bashful Felix (1934)
 Hearts are Trumps (1934)
 The Red Rider (1935)
 A Strange Guest (1936)

References

Bibliography

External links

1887 births
Year of death unknown
19th-century German Jews
Jewish German male actors
German male film actors
German male silent film actors
20th-century German male actors